Shariyeh may refer to:
 Sharieh-ye Omm-e Teman
 Sharieh-ye Seyyed Abud